Score is the fourth album by Paul Haslinger, which was released on January 26, 1999, on RGB Records.

Track listing

Personnel 
Musicians
Charlie Campagna – vocals
Karl "Bumi" Fian – trumpet
Paul Haslinger – instruments, production, engineering, mixing, cover art
S'Ange – vocals
Maria Schlieber – violin
Brian Williams – guitar, producer
Production and additional personnel
Stephen Hill – mastering, art direction
Bob Olhsson – mastering
Rex Ray – design
Mitch Zelezny – mixing

References

External links
 Score at Hearts of Space Records

1999 albums
Paul Haslinger albums
Hearts of Space Records albums